KJYO (102.7 FM), known as "KJ103", is a Top 40 (CHR) radio station serving the Oklahoma City area owned by iHeartMedia. Its transmitter is in Northeast Oklahoma City, and its studios are located at the 50 Penn Place building on the Northwest side.

History
The station began broadcasting April 8, 1961, as KJEM-FM, sister to KJEM (800 AM), and adopted an adult standards format. Studios were located where the Oklahoma City Federal Building (Murrah Building) once stood. It changed calls in 1972 to KAFG and ran an automated oldies format. KAFG's transmitter site was at 23rd and N. Classen on top of the Citizen's National Bank tower.

In May 1977 it re-launched as a rock station known as "The Zoo" and adopted the call letters KZUE. During this time it was owned by INSILCO Broadcasting which later changed its name to Clear Channel Radio, and eventually iHeartMedia. After losing its audience to the then new KOFM (now Magic 104.1), it became an AC station known as "Z-103" in 1979. The station adopted the handle "K-Joy" (The Joy of Oklahoma) and an easy listening format in 1981 and changed its call letters to KJYO. It has been a Top 40 (CHR) since 1983 but leaned towards the Rhythmic Top 40 format in 1989–1991 when it was known as "Kontinuous Jams." In late 2007, KJYO launched a HD2 subchannel that carried a new music format. In late 2015, KJYO-HD2 changed its new music format to that based on the iHeartRadio Music Festival.

KJYO, along with the other iHeart stations in Oklahoma City, simulcasts audio of KFOR-TV if a tornado warning is issued within the Oklahoma City metro area.

On Air
TJ, Janet, & JRod 5:30am-10am
Ryan Seacrest 10am-2pm
JJ Ryan 2pm-7pm

Former Air Personalities

•	Bob Campbell

•	Brad B

•	Brian (Ponch) Kelly (Now Mornings at KZPT/Kansas City)

•	Curt Spain

•	Dan Tooker

•	Danny Douglas

•	Domino (Former KIIS/Los Angeles, KISS/Dallas)

•	Dylan Sprague (Now Ops Manager of Clear Channel Boston)

• Aric Chase (later Executive Producer at WABC/New York City)

•	Frito

•	Greg Fisher (later known as Greg Knight at KKRW/Houston)

•	Jay "JR" Runyon

•	JD Stewart

•	Jimmy Barreda aka Joe Friday fka Andy Taylor (now Brand Manager at Champlin Broadcasting and Chisholm Trail Broadcasting)

•	Joel Folger

•	John Zondlo

•	Josh Knauer

•	Kramer

•	Mark Shannon (Deceased)

•	Maverick (Former PD of WiLD/Atlanta)

•	Michael Blake

•	Mike McCoy

•	Ric Reece

•	Ronnie Rocket (Now Mornings at KMXV/Kansas City)

•	Scholar Brad (Now afternoons at J-103 Chattanooga)

•	Stacy Barton

•	Steve Summers

•	Teresa Maxwell (Now Mornings at KMXV/Kansas City)

•	Tod Tucker (Deceased. Past PD WPUP and WGMG/Athens-Greater Atlanta for Cox Media Group.)

•	Woody Wood

References

External links
Station website

JYO
Contemporary hit radio stations in the United States
Radio stations established in 1961
IHeartMedia radio stations